Keyes Bungalow is a National Register of Historic Places structure in Altadena, California.  It was placed on the Register in 1978 for its significance as an example of a Craftsman style home.  It is also notable as being the home of Jackson Gregory an author of Westerns in the 1920s and 1930s.

The Keyes Bungalow's architecture is also known as "airplane" style for its wide, shallow roofline that resembles airplane wings.

References

External links

Houses in Altadena, California
Houses on the National Register of Historic Places in California
Bungalow architecture in California
American Craftsman architecture in California
National Register of Historic Places in Los Angeles County, California